Pisaasu (English: Phantom) is a 2014 Indian Tamil-language Gothic horror film film written and directed by Mysskin and produced by Bala under B Studios. The film stars  Naga, Rajkumar Pitchumani, Ashvatt alongside Radharavi, Kalyani Natarajan, Prayaga Martin and Harish Uthaman. The film released on 19 December 2014 to highly positive reviews. The Telugu dubbed version titled Pisachi released on 27 February 2015. The film was remade in Kannada as Raakshasi and in Hindi as Nanu Ki Jaanu.

Plot 
Siddharth Soundaarajan (Naga) is an upcoming violinist in Chennai, who stumbles upon an accident where a girl (Prayaga) is lying in a pool of blood. He rushes her to the hospital with the help of an auto driver and a couple. However, he is too late and the girl passes away holding his hand. Traumatized by the whole episode, Siddharth comes home with one of her slippers. He then drives around the city aimlessly with his red car while helping homeless people, unable to come out of the depression due to the girl's death.

After the incident, strange things start happening at Siddharth's apartment. He begins to feel a supernatural presence at his house. The house is cleaned up even if he makes it messy and his bottle opener goes missing whenever he tries to drink beer. With the help of his friend Badri (Ashvatt), he employs a psychic to exorcise the ghost, but she turns out to be a fraud and is scared out of the apartment by a strange apparition. Siddharth also comes to realise that his next door neighbour's autistic son plays with an imaginary friend. When Siddharth's mother Janaki (Kalyani Natarajan), comes to visit him, she is hit by a drunk neighbour (Harish Uthaman), who is abusing his wife (Kani Kusruti). The neighbour is then attacked by a mysterious ghost. The following day, Janaki meets with a freak accident in the bathroom and is saved by the ghost who alerts the neighbours. But, Siddharth mistakes that the ghost had attacked his mother and threatens the ghost that he would kill himself and come as a ghost to take revenge on her. Many rituals of various religions to drive the ghost away were performed by Siddharth, but everything is proven futile and the ghost continues to stay. Also, a petty thief is also stabbed while trying to steal from Siddharth's apartment.

Siddharth is assured that the ghost of the girl whose life he tried to save is behind all these strange occurrences and goes in search of her family to see if they can help get rid of her. He finds that girl's name is Bhavani and her father (Radha Ravi) runs a local ice factory. Siddharth confronts the father and asks him to cremate his daughter to save him from her ghost. Siddharth brings the father to his apartment to show him the ghost, when his mother calls from the hospital to tell him that it was actually the ghost who has saved her life. Bhavani's father then tries to see if the ghost is actually trying to protect Siddharth. When the ghost appears as expected, her father begs her to come home with him, but she remains at the apartment. Siddharth understands that Bhavani's spirit never meant him any harm.

Realizing that the only way Bhavani can rest in peace is by bringing her killer to face justice, Siddharth and his friends attempt to solve the mystery of her death themselves. They track down the auto driver that helped Siddharth save Bhavani and he tells them that he saw a green car driving away after the accident. They then manage to track down the green car at a shady workshop. The driver turns out to be a young man who stole an orphaned child from the hospital, since he and his wife cannot have children of their own.  The driver's cousin, who was in the car that day tells Siddharth that she saw the actual car that hit Bhavani that day and that it was not green but red, much like Siddharth’s own car. Siddharth then goes back to the auto driver and asks him to differentiate between red apples and green ones, which he cannot since he is colour blind.

Finally realising that he himself is the killer, Siddharth goes to tell Bhavani's father the truth. The ghost tries to stop him, but he still reveals the truth. Over-ridden with guilt, Siddharth tries to commit suicide. Bhavani's spirit saves Siddharth from committing suicide by cremating her own body that her father had preserved all this time in the ice, thus moving on to the next world. Bhavani's father comforts Siddharth by saying that he is a very kind hearted person and he would have never done that intentionally and that is why his daughter fell in love with him and stayed with him.

Cast 

 Naga as Siddharth Soundarrajan
 Radha Ravi as Bhavani's father
 Rajkumar Pitchumani as Yugi
 Ashvatt as Badri
 Kalyani Natarajan as Janaki Soundarrajan
 Prayaga Martin as Bhavani
 Harish Uthaman as Angry husband
 Kani Kusruti as (next door neighbour)Angry husband's wife
 Vinodhini Vaidyanathan as Mahesh's mother
 A. Dinesh Kumar as Mahesh's father
 Nimmy Raphael as Aavi Amala
 Siddhanth as Plato
 Samarth as Mahesh
 Amudhan as Sampath
 Supergood Subramani as Adaikalam (Auto Driver)
 Mohan Natarajan as Inspector
 Regan Rajendran as himself 
 Vincent Arul as Mechanic

Production 
After receiving positive reviews for Onaayum Aattukkuttiyum (2013), Mysskin was signed up by director Bala to make a film under his production house, B Studios. Mysskin subsequently left for the US to research and write the script for the horror film, before a launch ceremony for the venture was held in Chennai in May 2014 at midnight, contrary to typical morning time launches. Newcomers Naga and Prayaga Martin were cast in the principal roles, with the latter being selected to play a ghost after a successful audition. Naga had been selected by Bala, whom he had associated with as an assistant director for the director's project Tharai Thappattai (2015). Harish Uthaman was signed up to play a pivotal role and shot for his portions in June 2014. The team shot action scenes with Hong Kong stuntman Tony Leung Siu Hung, who collaborated with Mysskin after Mugamoodi (2012), while Ravi Roy, Jayashree Lakshminarayanan and newcomer Arrol Corelli joined the team as cinematographer, art director and music composer respectively. Malayalam actress Kani Kusruti, who had earlier featured in the film Burma, was also cast for a supporting role.

The team released a teaser trailer on 15 November 2014, revealing that production had been finished in fifty two days and the project had entered the post-production stage.

Soundtrack 
Soundtrack was composed by debutant Arrol Corelli and had only one track written by Thamizhachi Thangapandian.
Pogum Paadhai - Uthara Unnikrishnan

Release
The satellite rights of the film were sold to STAR Vijay.

Critical reception 

The Hindu's Baradwaj Rangan, who called Pisaasu a "terrific addition to one of the most exciting oeuvres in Tamil cinema", further wrote, "With most of our movies, we sense pages from the script being transposed to screen -- there's so little that can be called cinema. Mysskin's cinema is all cinema, and it appears to rise from some place deep within him, some place even he may not be aware of. And he's at a point now where he can execute the must-haves of commercial cinema in increasingly inventive ways...The filmmaking is more than clean. It's...pure". Rediff gave the film 3.5 stars out of 5 and wrote, "Deliberately paced, with stunning music and an intriguing plot, Pisaasu is a typical, thought-provoking Mysskin film that deserves much applause. The taut screenplay, simple dialogues, excellent characterisation and admirable performances coupled with perfect execution, make Mysskin's Pisaasu a must watch". Sify called it a "very satisfying horror movie. The film works to a large extent because there is a level of acting here that's rarely seen in films in this genre. Simple filmmaking techniques like camera angles, keen concepts and fantastic sequencing to create a truly terrifying horror experience that is mostly free of blood and gore, makes it an edge-of-the-seat thriller". silverscreen.in wrote, "The director's fascination for everything morbid is what drives the script. He's one of those artistes that paints penury in flattering colours, glorifies everything that is bare and poor, and gets lyrical with the dark and the dismal. Pisaasu is elementally Mysskin that way. It is dotted with the specially-abled, set against a grim canvas".

Deccan Chronicle gave 2.5 stars and wrote, "It may not scare you to death, but has interesting elements in it to keep you entertained. It is a different conceptualization of ghost and can be watched once for its novel experience". The Times of India gave the film 3 stars out of 5 and wrote, "the film, the second half to be specific, suffers from the same problem as Naga's Anandhapurathu Veedu. Once we realize the attitude of the ghost towards the protagonist, it takes away quite a bit of the tension. We know he will remain unharmed and so, there is nothing to dread anymore, and horror films need an element of fear to keep the viewer on the edge of the seat. But, the climax compensates for this..."

Box office 
Pisaasu released in 212 screens throughout Tamil Nadu and grossed 11.8 million on its first day, which was the best opening for a Mysskin film. Its opening weekend gross was estimated at  28.6 million. According to Sify, Pisaasu was one of the most profitable Tamil films of the year.

Sequel 
 
In 2020, a sequel titled Pisaasu 2 was announced by the director Mysskin, with Andrea Jeremiah , Shamna Kasim and Rajkumar Pitchumani.

References

External links 
 

2010s Tamil-language films
Films based on Indian folklore
Films directed by Mysskin
Indian horror films
2014 films
Tamil films remade in other languages
2014 horror films